King Xuan may refer to:

King Xuan of Zhou (died 782 BC)
King Xuan of Chu (died 340 BC)
King Xuan of Qi (died 301 BC)

See also
Emperor Xuan (disambiguation)
Duke Xuan (disambiguation)